USS Valley Forge (CG-50) was a  in the United States Navy. She was named for Valley Forge, where the Continental Army camped during one winter in the American Revolution.

Construction and commissioning 
The ship was built by Ingalls Shipbuilding in Pascagoula, Mississippi, and was launched on 29 September 1984, by her sponsor Julia Vadala Taft, wife of Deputy Secretary of Defense William H. Taft IV.

Service history
During the 1986 RIMPAC naval exercise, she acted as the plane guard for the aircraft carrier .

She saw action during Desert Storm in the USS Ranger battle group and served as the overall Anti-Air warfare commander for the gulf (Bravo Zulu AAWC).

In March 2003, Valley Forge was assigned to Destroyer Squadron 21.

The ship was decommissioned on 31 August 2004, at San Diego Naval Station, the first ship with the Aegis combat system withdrawn from service. Valley Forge was sunk on 2 November 2006, as part of a target practice on a test range near Kauai, Hawaii.

Awards

 Combat Action Ribbon - (16-28 Feb 1991)
 Joint Meritorious Unit Award - (Dec 1992-May 1993)	
 Navy Unit Commendation - (Jan-Feb 1991, Jan-May 2003)	
 Navy Meritorious Unit Commendation - (Dec 1994-May 1995, Jun-Dec 1998)
 Navy E Ribbon - (1989, 1995, 1998)
 Navy Expeditionary Medal - (Jun-Jul 1987)	
 Special Operations Service Ribbon - (Apr-May 1993)

References

External links

 
 USS Valley Forge webpage

 

Ticonderoga-class cruisers
Ships built in Pascagoula, Mississippi
1984 ships
Cold War cruisers of the United States
USS Valley Forge (CG-50)
Ships sunk as targets